The Tea Party (1991) is the first album by the Canadian rock group The Tea Party. It was originally recorded as a demo which the band submitted to several record companies. However, the trio was not signed to any recording contract and decided to release the album independently. The album production is relatively lo-fi and the band re-recorded several of the songs for their major label follow-up Splendor Solis. Only 3,500 copies of the album were made, some of which were cassettes, making the recording collectible to fans. On December 10, 2021, a deluxe remastered edition of the album was released.

Track listing

2021 Deluxe Edition (2LP 180 Gram Red Vinyl)

2021 Deluxe Edition (2CD Digipak)

Singles
No singles were released from this recording although a video was filmed for "Let Me Show You the Door".

Credits

The Tea Party
Jeff Burrows - drums and percussion
Stuart Chatwood - bass guitars, executive producer
Jeff Martin - guitars, vocals, producer

Others
Jeff Robillard - art direction
Michael Green - cover art

References

1991 debut albums
The Tea Party albums